Dehradun is the capital and the most populous city of the Indian state of Uttarakhand. It is also known as the school capital of India. It is the administrative headquarters of the eponymous district and is governed by the Dehradun Municipal Corporation, with the Uttarakhand Legislative Assembly holding its winter sessions in the city as its winter capital. Part of the Garhwal region, and housing the headquarters of its Divisional Commissioner. Dehradun is one of the "Counter Magnets" of the National Capital Region (NCR) being developed as an alternative center of growth to help ease the migration and population explosion in the Delhi metropolitan area and to establish a smart city in the Himalayas. It is the third largest city in the Himalayas after Kathmandu and Srinagar.

Dehradun is located in the Doon Valley on the foothills of the Himalayas nestled between Song river, a tributary of Ganga on the east and the Asan river, a tributary of Yamuna on the west. The city is noted for its picturesque landscape and slightly milder climate and provides a gateway to the surrounding region.

Dehradun is a notable academic and research hub and is home to the Indian Military Academy, Forest Research Institute, Indira Gandhi National Forest Academy, The Doon School, Welham Boys School, Welham Girls School, Brightlands School, Rashtriya Indian Military College, Uttarakhand Ayurveda University, Wadia Institute of Himalayan Geology and the Indian Institute of Remote Sensing. It is the headquarters of the Surveyor-General of India. According to the combined survey based on health, infrastructure, economy, education, and crime, conducted by Dainik Jagran and KPMG, Dehradun is one of India's safest cities. Dehradun is also known for its Basmati rice and bakery products.

Also known as the 'Abode of Drona', Dehradun has been an important center for Garhwal rulers and was captured by the British. For its strategic value, in addition to the location of its principal service academy, the Indian Armed Forces maintain a considerable presence in Dehradun, at the Garhi Cantonment and Naval Station. The Uttarakhand Police is the primary law enforcement agency in the city.

It is well connected and in proximity to Himalayan tourist destinations such as Mussoorie, Dhanaulti, Chakrata, New Tehri, Uttarkashi, Harsil, Chopta-Tungnath, Auli, and famous summer and winter hiking destinations like the Valley of Flowers at Dodital, Dayara Bugyal, Kedarkantha, Har Ki Dun and Hemkunt Sahib for camping and Himalayan panoramic views. The Hindu holy cities of Haridwar and Rishikesh, along with the Himalayan pilgrimage circuit of Chota Char Dham, viz. Yamunotri, Gangotri, Kedarnath and Badrinath, are also primarily accessed via Dehradun, the closest major city.

Etymology
Dehradun is made up of two words "dehra" + "dun." "dehra" is a Hindi word with the meaning of temple, whose etymology is: "dev" + "ghar", from Prakrit "devahara." "dūn" (or Hindi दून derives from the Sanskrit droṇī (or द्रोणि) and means "a tract of country lying at the foot of hills; a valley"

The town was established when Baba Ram Rai, the son of the seventh Sikh Guru, Guru Har Rai built a gurudwara or temple in the area in the 17th century. Ram Rai was sent by his father as an emissary to the Mughal emperor Aurangzeb in Delhi. Aurangzeb objected to a verse in the Sikh scripture (Asa ki Var) that stated, "the clay from a Musalman's grave is kneaded into potter's lump", considering it an insult to Islam. Baba Ram Rai explained that the text was miscopied and modified it, substituting "Musalman" with "Beiman" (faithless, evil) which Aurangzeb approved. The willingness to change a word led Guru Har Rai to bar his son from his presence, and name his younger son as his successor. Aurangzeb responded by granting Baba Ram Rai a jagir (land grant) in Garhwal region (Uttarakhand). The town later came to be known as Dehradun, after Dehra referring to Baba Ram Rai's shrine. Many followers of Ram Rai, called Ramraiyas, settled with Ram Rai, During the days of British Raj, the official name of the town was Dehra. In due time the word Dehra was linked to Dun, and thus the city was named Dehradun.

In the Skanda Purana, Dun is mentioned as a part of the region called Kedarkhand, the abode of Shiva. According to Hindu mythology, in ancient India during the Mahabharata epic era, Dronacharya, the great teacher of Kauravas and Pandavas, lived here, hence the name of "Dronanagari" (lit. city of Drona).

History 

The history of the city of Uttarakhand, Dehradun (nicknamed "Doon Valley") is linked to the story of Ramayana and Mahabharata. It is believed that after the battle between Ravana and Lord Rama, Lord Rama and his brother Lakshmana visited this site. Also, known as 'Dronanagari' on the name of Dronacharya, legendary Royal guru to the Kauravas and Pandavas in the epic Mahabharata, is believed to have been born and resided in Dehradun. Evidence such as ancient temples and idols have been found in the areas surrounding Dehradun which have been linked to the mythology of Ramayana and Mahabharata. These relics and ruins are believed to be around 2000 years old. Furthermore, the location, the local traditions and the literature reflect this region's links with the events of Mahabharata and Ramayana. Even after the battle of Mahabharata, the Pandavas had an influence on this region as the rulers of Hastinapura with the descendants of Subahu ruled the region as subsidiaries. Likewise, Rishikesh is mentioned in the pages of history when Lord Vishnu answered the prayers of the saints, slaughtered the demons and handed the land to the saints. The adjoining place called Chakrata has its historical impression during the time of Mahabharata.

In the seventh century, this area was known as Sudhanagara and was described by the Chinese traveler Huen Tsang. Sudhanagara later came to be recognized as Kalsi. Edicts of Ashoka have been found in the region along the banks of the river Yamuna in Kalsi indicating the wealth and importance of the region in ancient India. In the neighboring region of Haripur, ruins were discovered from the time of King Rasala which also reflect the region's prosperity. Before the name of Dehradun was used, the place is shown on old maps as Gurudwara (a map by Webb, 1808) or Gurudwara (a map by Gerard, 1818). Gerard's map names the place as "Dehra or Gurudwara". Surrounding this original Sikh temple were many small villages that are now the names of parts of the modern city.

Dehradun itself derives its name from the historical fact that Baba Ram Rai, the eldest son of the Seventh Sikh Guru Har Rai, set up his "Dera" (camp) in "dun" (valley) in 1676. This 'Dera Dun' later on became Dehradun.

The Mughal Emperor Aurangzeb was highly impressed by the miraculous powers of charismatic Ram Rai. He asked the contemporary Maharaja of Garhwal, Fateh Shah to extend all possible help to Ram Rai. Initially, a Gurudwara (temple) was built in Dhamawala. The construction of the present building, Guru Ram Rai Darbar Sahib, was completed in 1707. There are portraits of gods, goddesses, saints, sages and religious stories on the walls. There are pictures of flowers and leaves, animals and birds, trees, similar faces with pointed noses and big eyes on the arches which are the symbol of the colour scheme of Kangra-Guler art and Mughal art. High minarets and round pinnacles are the models of Muslim architecture. The huge pond in the front measuring  had dried up for want of water over the years. People had been dumping rubbish; it has been renovated and revived.

Dehradun was invaded by Mahmud of Ghazni during his campaigns into India followed by Timur in 1368, Rohilla chief Najib ad-Dawlah in 1757 and Ghulam Qadir in 1785. In 1806, the Nepalese warlord Kaji Amar Singh Thapa under the central leadership of Prime Minister Mukhtiyar Bhimsen Thapa united many of the Indian territories that now fell under places such as Almora, Pathankot, Kumaon, Garhwal, Sirmur, Shimla, Kangra and Dehradun.

On the western front Garhwal and parts of Himachal Pradesh up to Punjab and on the eastern front the state of Sikkim up to Darjeeling became parts of Nepal for a brief period until the British East India Company went on the war from 1814 to 1816. The war ended with the signing of the Treaty of Sugowli where almost a third was ceded to British East India company. The British got Dehradun in 1816 and colonized Landour and Mussoorie in 1827–1828.

Jawaharlal Nehru, India's first prime minister, was quite fond of the city and often visited. He spent his last few days here before passing away in Delhi in 1964. Another leader from the independence movement, Rash Behari Bose, who was one of the key organizers of the Ghadar conspiracy and, later, the Indian National Army was based in Dehradun in his early days before he was forced to move to Japan in 1915 to continue the freedom struggle.

Post-independence Dehradun and other parts of Garhwal and Kumaon were merged with United Provinces which was later renamed the state of Uttar Pradesh. In 2000, Uttarakhand state (earlier called Uttaranchal) was created from the northwestern districts of Uttar Pradesh under the Uttar Pradesh Reorganization Act, 2000. Dehradun was made its interim capital.

Afghan connection
Dehradun's Afghan connection dated back to the First Anglo-Afghan War, after which the Afghan Emir Dost Mohammad Khan was exiled by the British to Dehra Dun. He stayed in Mussoorie for over 6 years. The Balahissar ward under the Mussoorie municipality has been named after the palace of Dost Mohammad. The famous Dehradooni Basmati was brought along by him from Kunar Province in Afghanistan and it continues to be counted as a delicacy of the valley.

Forty years later, after the Second Anglo-Afghan War, his grandson, Mohammad Yaqub Khan, was sent to exile to India in 1879. Just like his grandfather, he chose Doon valley as his abode. Yakoob became the first Afghan to formally settle in Dehradun. The present Mangla Devi Inter College was once the Kabul Palace where Yakoob spent a few years of his life. The extended family and servants of the King were also relocated to Dehradun.

The Afghan royal family maintained a presence in Dehra Dun. It was the birthplace of the second to last King of Afghanistan, Mohammed Nadir Shah. Two quaint palaces – the Kabul Palace in Dehradun and Bala Hissar Palace in Mussoorie – stand testimony to this connection with Afghanistan. They were built by these Afghan rulers in exile in India in the early part of the 20th Century and are palaces are a miniature replica of the palatial structures owned by the kings in Afghanistan. The Bala Hissar Palace has now been turned into Mussoorie's Wynberg Allen School. Doon-based heritage enthusiast Ghanshyam told the Times of India, "The police station at Karanpur used to be the royal guard room of Yakoob way back in 1879. The electrical office located at the Survey Chowk was the royal servant quarters."

Today the descendants of the former royalty, Yakub Khan and his grandson Sardar Azim Khan's family have integrated with the mainstream of Dehra Dun life. The Doon connection was revived when Zahir Shah, the last king of Afghanistan while undergoing treatment in New Delhi during the last years of his life expressed a desire to meet his Doon cousins but the meeting could not take place as the family members were away.Ashraf Ghani, the current President of Afghanistan has mentioned that his grandmother grew up in Dehra Dun. "I speak of Tagore because I was raised on Tagore by my grandmother who lived in Dehradun...," Dr Ghani said while talking about India's vision and the remarkable transformation. Dehra Dun is also being selected to be the second "home" ground of the Afghan cricket team. and Afghan cricket fans recall this "centuries old link" with the town.

Geography 

Malsi is the starting point of Lesser Himalayan Range that extends to Mussoorie and beyond. Its geomorphological and meteorological characteristics make it prone to a number of natural hazards. Beside earthquakes, the region is frequently devastated by landslides, cloudbursts, flash-floods, cold waves and hailstorms.

The Doon valley contains the settlements including Raiwala, Rishikesh, Doiwala, Harrawala, Dehradun, Herbertpur, Vikasnagar, Sahaspur, Selaqui, Subhash Nagar and Clement Town. The district houses Rajaji National Park which is home to elephants, Benog Wildlife Sanctuary at Mussoorie & Asan Conservation Reserve (Asan Barrage). The Doon Valley has the Terai and Bhabar forests within it as well as the Shivalik hills and Lesser Himalayan Range containing hill stations such as Mussoorie and Chakrata. The district is bordered by the Himalayas in the north, Rajaji Range of the Sivalik Hills to the south, the river Ganges to the east, and the Yamuna river to the west. Towns in the foothills of the mountain ranges include Sahastradhara, Lakhamandal, Gautam Kund, Chandrabani, Kalsi and Dakpathar.

This district is divided into two major parts: the main city Dehradun surrounded by Shivalik and the Jaunsar-Bawar, which is in the foothills of Himalayas. In the north and northwest it borders on the district of Uttarkashi and Tehri Garhwal, in the east and southeast by Pauri Garhwal and Ganges river, in the west, it is bordered by Shimla and Sirmaur districts of Himachal Pradesh, Yamunanagar district of Haryana and the Tons and Yamuna rivers. To the south are Haridwar and Uttar Pradesh's Saharanpur district. It is between latitudes 30°01' N and 31°2'N and longitudes 77°34' E and 78°18'E. This district consists of six tehsils – Dehradun, Chakrata, Vikasnagar, Kalsi, Tiuni and Rishikesh – six community development blocks – Vis, Chakrata, Kalsi, Vikasnagar, Sahaspur, Rajpur and Doiwala – 17 towns and 764 villages. Out of these 746 villages are inhabited; 18 are uninhabited.

Heritage canal network

There was once an extensive canal network in the city, which irrigated many surrounding villages and produced a cooler microclimate in the region. The earliest canal, Rajpur canal, was laid in the 17th century. After Dehradun became the state capital in 2000, most of the heritage canals were covered or demolished to widen the city roads. Environmental groups have campaigned for the revival of the network, citing its benefit for the city's ecology, aesthetics, microclimate and built environment.

Climate 

The climate of Dehradun is humid subtropical. It varies greatly from tropical to severe cold depending upon the altitude of the area. The city is in Doon Valley and temperature variations due to difference in elevation are considerable. In the hilly regions, the summer is pleasant. Although the temperature in Dehradun can reach below freezing during severe cold snaps, this is not common. Most of the annual rainfall in the city is received during the months from June to September, July and August being rainiest. During the monsoon season, there is often heavy and protracted rainfall. Agriculture benefits from fertile alluvial soil, adequate drainage and plentiful rain.

Demographics 

The 2011 census reported a population of 978,420 in Dehradun city; male and female are 303,411 and 275,009 respectively. The sex ratio of the city is 906 per 1000 males. Natives of Uttarakhand form the majority of Dehradun's population. The sex ratio of the city is 907 per 1000 males and child sex ratio of is 873 girls per 1000 boys, lower than the national average. The number of children of age under six in Dehradun city was 80,180 as per figure from Census India report on 2011. There are 50,600 boys and 28,580 are girls.  Total numbers of slums in Dehradun city and its Out Growth numbers 32,861 in which population of 158,542 resides. This is around 27.58% of total population of Dehradun city & its outgrowth which is 574,840.

Hindi, the official state language, is the primary language in Dehradun. English is also used, particularly by defence wing and the white-collar workforce. Native regional languages include Garhwali, Kumaoni and Jaunsari. Other major languages are Punjabi, Nepali, Bhojpuri, Bengali and Tibeto-Burman. Hindus form the majority of Dehradun's population; Muslims compose a large minority. According to provisional results of the 2011 national census, Hinduism is majority religion in Dehradun city with 71.53% followers. Sikhism is the second most practiced religion in the city with approximately 22.75% following it. Christianity by 3.5%, Christianity is followed by 1.06%, Jainism by 0.63%, and Buddhism by 0.29%. Around 0.01% stated 'Other Religion', approximately 0.24% stated 'No Particular Religion'.

Dehradun's literacy rate at 89.32% is the highest in the region. Male literacy is 92.65% and female literacy is 85.66%. The number of literates in Dehradun city is 463,791, of which 251,832 are males and 211,959 are females.

Government and politics
As capital of the state of Uttarakhand, Dehradun houses important state government facilities such as the offices of the local governing agencies, the Vidhan Sabha (the home of the Uttarakhand state legislature), and Raj Bhavan (the residence of the governor of Uttarakhand). Most government establishments and institutions are housed in the city.

Dehradun city falls in Garhwal division of Uttarakhand which is headed by the divisional commissioner of Dehradun, who is an Indian Administrative Service (IAS) officer of high seniority. The district magistrate and collector of Dehradun report to the divisional commissioner as well. The DM is assisted by a chief development officer; five additional district magistrates for finance/revenue, city, rural administration, land acquisition and civil supply. The city is represented in two Lok Sabha constituencies, of Tehri Garhwal by MP Mala Rajya Laxmi Shah from the BJP, and Garhwal represented by BJP's Tirath Singh Rawat, elected in 2019. The city is also represented by four MLAs elected from four state assembly constituencies, as per the 2008 delimitation:

Civic administration

Nagar Nigam Dehradun, also called Dehradun Municipal Corporation, is the local government of the city. The corporation originated in 1998. Prior to December 2003, this body was known as Dehradun Municipal Council, and after revamping the municipality, the Dehradun Municipal Corporation came into existence under the Uttarakhand (The Uttar Pradesh Municipal Corporation Act, 1959) (Amendment) Act, 2017.

In 2017, with the inclusion of 72 adjoining villages in the DMC limits, the number of wards increased from 60 to 100. As of 2020, the corporation consists of 100 wards and the elected head is the mayor who presides over a deputy mayor and 99 other corporators representing the wards. The mayor is directly elected for a period of five years and is currently Sunil Uniyal Gama, elected in November 2018.

The municipal commissioner is the executive head of the local government institutions (the municipal corporation) in the division, in charge of infrastructure development in his division, and is also responsible for maintaining law and order in the division. As of 2020, the municipal commissioner is Vinay Shankar Pandey while the deputy municipal commissioner is Soniya Pant. The corporation has the following departments: public works, property tax, health, street lights, project implementation unit, Information Technology and sanitation. As per the ASICS report 2017, Dehradun municipality generates very few of its own revenues and relies primarily on grants from the state government. The municipality collects revenue from property taxes and parking fees.

Other urban entities involved in civic services and city governance and management include parastatals like the Mussoorie Dehradun Development Authority (MDDA), Special Area Development Authority (SADA), Jal Sansthan, and Jal Nigam among others. These oversee the city's civic infrastructure which comes under Dehradun Urban Agglomeration and covers a population of 714,223 according to the 2011 census.

Police administration 
The headquarters of Uttarakhand Police are located in Dehradun. While the state is headed by the Director general of police, the district is headed by Deputy inspector general of police (DIG) Garhwal. The city's nodal police officer is the superintendent of police (SP City) who reports to the senior superintendent of police (SSP) who also holds the post of DIG.

Dehradun falls under the Lucknow zone of the Chief Bureau of Investigation (CBI), which is part of the central government. Assistant Commissioner of Police (ACB) Dehradun, has jurisdiction over 13 districts in Uttarakhand.

Civic utilities

Water supply 
Dehradun city receives potable water from two primary sources- surface water and groundwater to meet its supply needs. The sources of water were mainly from Kaulu khet Spring, Maussifall, Bindal River, Bijapur canal and more than 100 tubewells. It suffers from lack of sufficient ground water recharge and depleting ground water tables. The water supply of Dehradun is operated and maintained by Uttarakhand Jal Sansthan (UJS), a state agency.

Solid waste management, sewerage 
The sewage of Dehradun is operated and maintained by Uttarakhand Jal Sansthan (UJS) but is also selectively under the aegis of the Smart City project funded by the central government. As per a report from 2015, only 25% of the city is covered by the existing sewage system. According to the Smart Cities Annexe 2, the sewerage covers 30% of the city, and has an efficiency of 10%.

The city of Dehradun generates  of waste per day. The landfill or dumping site has since shifted from the dumping ground on Sahastradhara road in 2017 to one centralized solid waste processing plant in Dehradun, Shishambara on the outskirts of the city which has the capacity of 600 MP per day. Only 69 of the 100 wards in the city are covered by this plant and only 3% of the wards in Dehradun have 100% segregation of waste at source. Segregation of waste at source is lacking in the city, although the municipality spends around one crore per month on collection and transportation of solid waste. A decentralized pilot project was started in Nathuwala ward with the help of local residents and an NGO called Feedback Foundation and has since been declared a zero waste zone.

Electricity in Dehradun is regulated through the Uttarakhand Power Corporation Limited (UPCL), while Fire services are handled by the Uttarakhand Fire and Emergency Services. State-owned Bharat Sanchar Nigam Limited, or BSNL, as well as private enterprises, among them Vodafone, Bharti Airtel, Reliance, Idea Cellular, and Tata Teleservices are the leading telephone and cell phone service providers in the city.

Public health
The healthcare facilities in Dehradun consist of private and public hospitals, formal and informal service providers as well as secondary and tertiary healthcare with single clinic doctors. In spite of having special status under the National Health Mission, the city is facing a healthcare crisis due to the shortage of medical manpower in the state and financial constraints. Hospitals and medical centers in the Dehradun are plagued by non-functioning equipment in the operating theatre and the insufficient number of labor rooms. Hospitals in the city include the Doon Hospital, Max Super Specialty Hospital, Shri Mahant Indresh Hospital, Himalayan Hospital, Uttaranchal Ayurvedic Hospital, Combined Medical Institute (CMI) Hospital, Luthra Hospital, and Government Hospital Premnagar (managed by the state government).

Education

Schools 

Schools in Dehradun are classified as aided, unaided and Government schools. These schools are affiliated with CBSE, Indian Certificate of Secondary Education (ICSE) or CISCE; except for the government schools, which are run directly by the Uttarakhand Board of School Education and follow the syllabus prescribed by the state government. The language of instruction in schools is either English or Hindi.

Uttarakhand Board of School Education is responsible for administering courses of instructions, textbooks, and to conduct examinations for secondary school students of the state. The board was set up in 2001 and is headquartered in Ramnagar.

Notable private educational institutions in Dehradun include  Doon International School,The Asian School, Cambrian Hall, Colonel Brown Cambridge School, Convent of Jesus and Mary, The Doon School, Ecole Globale International Girls' School, Marshall School, Rashtriya Indian Military College, SelaQui International School, St Joseph's Academy, Dehradun, St. Thomas' College, Welham Boys School and Welham Girls School, Indian Army Public Schools. Several Indian and international luminaries have attended these schools. In addition to these schools there are many other state board schools located in the city. Since Dehradun has many central Government offices, there are as many as 12 Kendriya Vidyalayas also in the city.

Higher education and research 

After completing their secondary education, students typically enrol in schools that have a higher secondary facility and are affiliated with the Directorate of higher education, the ICSE, or the CBSE. The colleges are each affiliated with a university or institution based either in Uttarakhand or elsewhere in India. In recent times, Dehradun has evolved as a pivot location for higher education in India. Premier research institutes based in Dehradun are Doon University, Forest Research Institute, Dehradun Institute of Technology (DIT), Indian Institute of Remote Sensing, Indian Institute of Petroleum, Himgiri Zee University, Wildlife Institute of India, Instruments Research and Development Establishment and Wadia Institute of Himalayan Geology. Universities located in Dehradun are Hemwati Nandan Bahuguna Uttarakhand Medical Education University, Sardar Bhagwan Singh University, Uttaranchal University, Doon University, Institute of Chartered Financial Analysts of India University, Dehradun, University of Petroleum and Energy Studies, Swami Rama Himalayan University, Graphic Era University and Uttarakhand Technical University.

Uttarakhand Technical University has eight constituent institutes and approximately 132 affiliated colleges

The campus of  Forest Research Institute which was established in the year 1906 hosts the Indira Gandhi National Forest Academy (IGNFA), the staff college that trains officers selected for the Indian Forest Service (IFS). Wildlife Institute of India (WII) is an autonomous institution under the Ministry of Environment Forest and Climate change, Government of India which carries out wildlife research.

Dehradun has four medical colleges. Government Doon Medical College is the only government medical college located in the city.  Private medical colleges include Shri Guru Ram Rai Institute of Medical & Health Sciences affiliated to Hemwati Nandan Bahuguna Uttarakhand Medical Education University and Himalayan Institute of Medical Sciences affiliated to Swami Rama Himalayan University. These three medical colleges caters to the population of Dehradun and nearby hilly areas.

National Institute for Empowerment of People with Visual Disabilities (NIEPVD) plays a key role in helping blind people. It is the first such institute in India and the first press for Braille script in the country which provides education and service to the blind children. Dehradun houses organizations like the Latika Roy Foundation for people with disabilities to access education, employment, and full inclusion in the community. The ASK Foundation, an educational charity, is also located in Dehradun.

Notable scholars who were born, worked or studied in Dehradun include former prime minister Rajiv Gandhi, scientists Manju Bansal & Chandramukhi Basu, writer William McKay Aitken, poet Kanwal Ziai, German-British botanist Dietrich Brandis, footballer Anirudh Thapa, and DICCI member Rajesh Saraiya.

Economy

The main source of economy in Dehradun is its tourist places. The city's economy is enhanced by the presence of nearby national parks, mountain peaks and historical sites. Dehradun has a per capita income close to $2,993 (per 2020 figures). It has witnessed a strong economic growth in the last 20 years. Dehradun has experienced a commercial and information technology upswing, amplified by the establishment of software technology parks of India (STPI). and SEZs (Special economic zones) throughout.

The largest profession in Dehradun is agriculture. Staple foods are rice and dal with raita, curd and salad. Dehradun is known for its lychees and for growing the world's finest basmati rice.

It hosts training institutions of national importance such as the Indian Military Academy, Indira Gandhi National Forest Academy (IGNFA), Zoological Survey of India (ZSI). It is home to national foundations such as the Ordnance Factory Dehradun, Instruments Research and Development Establishment (IRDE), Defence Electronics Application Laboratory (DEAL) and other defence establishments. Other institutions include the Indian Institute of Petroleum, National Institute for Visually Handicapped, Central Soil and Water Conservation Research & Training Institute, Oil and Natural Gas Corporation (Keshav Dev Malviya Institute of Petroleum Exploration, Institute of Drilling Technology), Uttarakhand Space Applications Centre, Survey of India, Wadia Institute of Himalayan Geology, Forest Survey of India (FSI), Indian Council of Forestry Research and Education (ICFRE), Indian Institute of Remote Sensing, Wildlife Institute of India, Forest Research Institute (FRI), Army Cadet College and the Rashtriya Indian Military College (RIMC).

Major defence production establishments include the Ordnance Factory Dehradun, the Opto Electronics Factory of the Ordnance Factories Board, Defence Electronics Application Laboratory and Instruments Research and Development Establishment of the Defence Research and Development Organization which manufactures products for the Indian Armed Forces. Many of these are located in the Raipur area. The Ordnance Factory estate is located in the middle of the mountains.

Transport

Airway

Dehradun is served by Dehradun Airport, also known as Jolly Grant Airport , which began its commercial operations in on 30 March 2008. It's  from the city center and lies in Doiwala. The nearest international airport is in New Delhi. Over 1,325,931 passengers passed through the airport in 21–22, making it the 33rd busiest airport in India. The airport is to be developed as an international airport, which has caused protests since it would require the felling of trees in the ecologically sensitive area of Thano. There is also a helicopter service from Dehradun to Chinyalisaur a town in Uttarkashi district and Gauchar.

Railway
Dehradun railway station is the city's largest train station. Part of the Northern Railways (NR) zone, railway station was established in year 1899 by the British, it is the last station on the Northern railway line in the area. The Indian Railway Stations Development Corporation (IRSDC) is working on the redevelopment of existing railway stations to turn them into world-class travel hubs.

Roads
Dehradun lies on the National Highway 7, National Highway 307 which connects it to states Punjab, Haryana, Himachal Pradesh, and Uttar Pradesh. There are two sets of major roads in Dehradun city, one along NE-SW (Rajpur main road) and the other along with NW-SE (Raipur, Kaulagarh and Chakrata) directions and they, in turn, are connected to another minor road network. The road density is high in the central part of the city around the bus stand and railway station. The Uttarakhand Transport Corporation (UTC), a public sector passenger road transport corporation is a major constituent of the transport system in Uttarakhand operates intracity and intercity bus service. There are also private transport operators operating approximately 3000 buses on non-nationalized routes along with a few interstate routes. Other modes of travel for local inter-city transportation are public transportation buses, auto rickshaws and cycle rickshaws.

Culture

After becoming the capital, there has been continuous growth in education, communication and transport. As the state capital, Dehradun is home to many government institutions.

City buses are identified with blue bars. There are auto rickshaw which are often used for transportation but blamed for pollution and noise. The evening buzz of Rajpur road is an attraction. The city center is easily recognized by the Clock tower (Ghanta Ghar), a structure with four functioning clocks. The statue of San Dijen placed in Shanti Niketan contributes to the beauty of the city. Dehradun has been home to artists and writers including Stephen Alter, Nayantara Sahgal, Allan Sealy, Ruskin Bond and also to country singer Bobby Cash.

Dehradun was home to freedom fighters whose names are engraved in gold on the Clock Tower. It was called "The Gray City" in the initial days because ex-Army officers and VIPs considered this place ideal for residence after retirement.

There are fairs (melas) throughout the year. Notable fairs include Magh Mela, held on 14 January and Jhanda Mela in March, a fair for the Sikh community, that attracts Sikhs from all over India and abroad.

Tourism 
Tourist destinations include the Dehradun Zoo, Kalanga Monument, Chandrabani, Himalayan Gallery cum Regional Science Centre Guchhupani, Forest Research Institute, Uttara Museum of Contemporary Art, Tapovan, Lakshman Siddha Peeth, Tapkeshwar Temple, Santala Devi Temple, Mindrolling Monastery, Prakasheshwar Mahadev Temple, Sai Mandir, Central Braille Press and Wadia Institute of Himalayan Geology.

The tourist destinations can be divided into four or five areas: nature, sports, sanctuary, museums and institutions. The nearby hill stations are well known for their natural environment, temples for its faith dimensions, sanctuary for animal and bird lovers. Hill stations include Mussoorie, Sahastradhara, Chakrata, and Dakpathar. Famous temples include Tapkeshwar, Lakhamandal and Santala Devi.

Places of interest 
There are a number of small towns and tourist sites in Dehradun District.

Kipling Trail 
The Kipling Trail is the old walking route between Dehradun and Mussoorie that was named after English novelist Rudyard Kipling, who is believed to have walked the trail in the 1880s. It begins at Shahanshahi Ashram in Rajpur village. The trail is being revived as nature, history and hiking enthusiasts are increasingly using the trail over driving up to the hill station.

Khalanga War Memorial 

The Battle of Nalapani was the first battle of the Anglo-Nepalese War of 1814–1816, fought between the forces of the British East India Company and Nepal, then ruled by the House of Gorkha. The battle took place around the Nalapani fort, near Dehradun, which was placed under siege by the British between 31 October and 30 November 1814.

Maa Bala Sundari Mandir 
There are various temples of Maa Bala Sundari Devi situated in India and this is one such temple. The main temple is in Trilokpur, Himachal Pradesh. This temple is situated approximately  South-West Direction of Sudhowala. This great temple is situated inside a forest. Gaur Brahmin of Sudhowala are Pandits (Brahman) of this temple. It is dedicated to the Hindu goddess Maa Bala Sundari, also known as Bal Roop of Maa Vaishno Devi, a manifestation of the Hindu Mother Goddess Mahalakshmi. The words "maa" and "mata" are commonly used in India for "mother", and thus are often used in connection with Maa Bala Sundari.

Various modes of transportation are available from Sudhowala, including ponies, electric vehicles and palkis operated by 2 or 4 persons. Many pilgrims visit from the northern Indian states to get the blessings of Mahamaya Bala Sundari. A trust is also run by Mandir Maa Bala Sundari Trust, Sudhowala.

Dehradun International Cricket Stadium 

Rajiv Gandhi International Cricket Stadium, Dehradun is a multi-purpose stadium in the Raipur area of Dehradun, Uttarakhand. It is the first international level stadium in the state.

Robber's Cave 
Believed to be the hideout of the famous Sultana Daaku and his band of dacoits. The cave formation has thus been named Robber's Cave.

In the central part there is a fort wall structure which is now broken. It consists of an extremely narrow gorge formed in a conglomerate limestone area on Doon Valley's Dehra plateau.

It is a natural cave formation where rivers flows inside the cave. The place is a tourist site and is maintained by Uttarakhand State. Local bus services are available up to Anarwala village, from where it is a 1 km trek.

Lachhiwala Picnic Spot 
It is a popular tourist destination especially during summers. It is well known for its forest scenic beauty, man-made water pools and bird watching. It is now known as Nature Park.

Tapkeshwar Temple 
It is a temple of Pashupati Lord Shiva. It is situated beside a forest on the bank of the Asan river and the main deity (Shivalinga) is housed in a natural cave. According to the holy epic Mahabharata, Guru Drona is said to have resided in this cave for a period of time. The temple's natural cave is named Drona cave after him. Water trickles down the ceiling of the cave and drops on the Shivalinga creating a magnificent image.

Dehradun Zoo 
Formerly known as Malsi Deer Park, the main objectives of Dehradun Zoo are conservation of wild animals, developing an education center and a rescue center for wild animals. It is located on the foothills of Shivalik Range on the Mussoorie Road.

Forest Research Institute 
Forest Research Institute or 'FRI' is an institution in the field of forest research in India. It was founded as India's first forestry school in 1878 by Lt Col Frederick Bailey FRSE FRSGS of the Royal Engineers.

The institute is one of the oldest and biggest forest-based training institutes in India. The institute is known for its research work and wonderful architecture that dates to British Raj. FRI is affiliated to the Forest Research Institute University and is approved by the University Grants Commission (UGC). The aim of the institution is to accomplish the needs of the Indo-Gangetic plains of Punjab, Haryana, Chandigarh, Delhi and western Uttar Pradesh, as well as the Uttarakhand Himalayas.

Uttara Museum of Contemporary Art 
Uttara Museum of Contemporary Art is an art museum in Dehradun dedicating multi-dimensional artworks in the memory of the Kedarnath disaster, 2013 North India floods.

The museum was founded in 2017 and is Uttarakhand's first art museum. It exhibits various aspects of the calamity and the folk culture of Uttarakhand through paintings, sculptures, and other artworks.

Regional Science Center 
Regional Science Center (RSC) is located within the campus of Uttarakhand Council of Science and Technology (UCOST) at Vigyan Dham, Suddhowala on the outskirts of Dehradun. The Uttarakhand Regional Science Center is developed by the National Council for Science Museum (NCSM) in collaboration with the UCOST. The Regional Science Center is a popular destination for school educational tours and hosts a science museum, planetarium, a 3D theatre, science gallery and scientific law based interactive exhibits.

Lambi Dehar Mines 
A deserted Limestone Mine supposed to be a haunted place is located in the Mussoorie Range of Dehradun District.

Virasat 
Virasat is a cultural festival that celebrates all aspects of the country's cultural heritage. The festival was held for the first time in 1995 in Dehradun. It is recognised as the Afro-Asia's biggest folk life and heritage festival. Organized by REACH (Rural Entrepreneurship for Art & Cultural Heritage), this week-long festival includes performances and workshops in Indian folk and classical arts, literature, crafts, theatre, cinema and yoga.

Virasat 2008 expanded the festival into a nationwide event.

Media
Most of the media houses in Uttarakhand are based in Dehradun. Among Dehradun's widely circulated Hindi-language newspapers are Dainik Tribune, Shah Times, Uttarakhand Aaj, Dainik Jagran, Gorkha Sandesh, Hindustan Rashtriya Sahara, Divya Himgiri, and Amar Ujala.  The Dehradun Street and The Garhwal Post are two major English-language newspapers that are produced and published from the city. Other popular English-language newspapers published and sold in Dehradun include The Himachal Times, Deccan Herald, The Times of India, and Hindustan Times.

All India Radio, the national state-owned radio broadcaster, has AM radio stations in the city. All India Radio also airs an FM radio station known as AIR North. Dehradun has five FM stations including, AIR Dehradun, Radio Dehradun (community radio station), Red FM 93.5, Radio Zindagi, Hello Doon (NIVH) and Himagiri Ki Awaaz. There is a Doordarshan Kendra in the city and provides state-owned free-to-air terrestrial channel DD Uttarakhand. A mix of Hindi, English, and other regional channels are accessible via cable subscription, direct-broadcast satellite service or Internet-based television. Direct-to-Home (DTH) entertainment services in Dehradun include Videocon d2h, DD Direct+, Dish TV, Reliance Digital TV, Airtel digital TV and Tata Sky.

Sport

The high mountains and rivers of Uttarakhand attract many tourists and adventure seekers. It is also a favourite destination for adventure sports, such as paragliding, sky diving, rafting and bungee jumping. The first indoor ice rink in India that meets the size requirements for ice hockey, figure skating, short track and rink bandy was built in Dehradun.

As in the rest of India, cricket is popular among city youth. Cricket Association of Uttarakhand, which regulates cricket in Uttarakhand, is also based in the city. The multi-purpose Rajiv Gandhi International Cricket Stadium, which has a capacity of 20,000 as of 2016, is the first international level stadium in the state. It is home to the Uttarakhand cricket team and second home to the Afghanistan cricket team. A Mega Sports Complex is situated in the Raipur area of Dehradun.

In sports tourism, the Doon Ice Rink at Maharana Pratap Sports Complex, Raipur is the first full-sized ice arena in India. It has hosted ice skating competitions and ice hockey tournaments, including the IIHF Challenge Cup of Asia.

Since, the formation of the state in 2000, the state suffered a blow to its sports facilities as Uttar Pradesh had the entire infrastructure for sports. Uttarakhand had hosted very few matches of Ranji Trophy. Due to lack of infrastructure, players started moving to different states. In November 2012, Former Chief Minister of Uttarakhand Vijay Bahuguna laid the foundation of the stadium hoped that the stadium would bring Dehradun on the international cricket map.
On 16 December 2016, Chief Minister Harish Rawat inaugurated the stadium along with Rajeev Shukla (the IPL chairperson). The stadium has a seating capacity of 25,000 people, along with floodlights facility for conducting day-night matches. The stadium is built on a 23-acre site and was selected as the second home ground for the Afghanistan cricket team in India.

 Doon School Ground
 RIMC Cricket Ground
 Abhimanyu Cricket Academy Ground
 MPSC Cricket Ground
 Rangers College Cricket Ground
 Survey of India Cricket Ground
 Doon Cricket Academy Ground
 Tanush Cricket Academy Ground

Architecture
After Dehradun was made the capital of Uttarakhand, there was a construction boom, especially in residential properties.  Modern buildings have gradually supplanted older architectural styles including those related to the British colonial rule of India. Important older buildings still upstanding include the Clock Tower, Forest Research Institute, CNI College, Morrison Memorial Church, Inamullah Building, Jama Masjid, Osho Meditation Centre, Indian Military Academy and Darbar Sahib.

In popular culture

George Harrison of the Beatles wrote a song called "Dehra Dun" during the group's stay in Rishikesh in early 1968. The song remained unreleased until its appearance on the super deluxe edition of Harrison's album All Things Must Pass in 2021.

Notable people

List of notable personalities from Dehradun :

 Abhinav Bindra – Olympic gold medalist shooter
 Anshul Jubli –MMA fighter, Road to UFC winner, presently signed with UFC
 Dehra Parker (1882– 1963) – Former MP of Parliament of Northern Ireland
 Jubin Nautiyal – Indian singer
 Raghav Juyal – Dancer, television host
 Amardeep Jha – film actress
 Anirudh Dave – TV actor
 Anirudh Agarwal – Actor
 Ali Abbas Zafar – film director
 Saira Banu – former film actress in 1960s
 Bobby Cash – Country music artist
 Archana Puran Singh – TV, film actress
 Vikas Gupta – Producer, TV presenter, former Bigg Boss contestant
 Vir Das – Film actor and stand-up comedian
 Anirudh Thapa – football player
 Asha Negi – television actress
 Surendra Pal Joshi 
 Deepa Sahi – actress
 Deepak Dobriyal –TV actor
 Hemant Pandey – Film actor
 Himani Shivpuri – Actress
 K. N. Singh – actor
 Madhurima Tuli – actress
 Monisha Kaltenborn – Business women
 Nirmal Pandey – actor
 Nitin Sahrawat Actor, environmentalist
 Rrahul Sudhir – TV actor
 Sanjay Kaul - political activist
 Shivangi Joshi – TV actor
 Shraddha Sharma – singer
 Sonam Bisht – television actress
 Sudhanshu Pandey – model
 Tom Alter – former TV and film actor
 Udita Goswami –former actress
 Lokesh Ohri – anthropologist and heritage activist
 Vikram Singh Chauhan – television actor

See also 

 Dehradun Municipal Corporation
 List of cities in Uttarakhand and Himachal Pradesh by population
 Garhwal Division
 Doiwala
 Haridwar
 Roorkee
 Rishikesh

References

 
Dehradun district
Places in the Ramayana
Cities in Uttarakhand
Smart cities in India
Populated places established in the 1670s
1670s establishments in Asia